Parkside Hawks was a rugby league team based in Hunslet, Leeds. They played in the Yorkshire division of the Rugby League Conference.

History
Parkside Hawks were formed in 2009 as a joint venture between Hunslet Parkside and Hunslet Hawks. Players were drawn from the Hawks under-18 side as well as from surrounding winter clubs such as Hunslet Old Boys, Hunslet Warriors, Queens, Milford, and East Leeds. Hawks joined the Midlands Merit League, a feeder competition for the Rugby League Conference, but were moved up to the RLC North Midlands division after 1 game. They went on to win the 2009 RLC North Midlands title.

The club were in the newly formed Yorkshire division for the 2010 season and went on to win it before making it to the RLC regional finals where they lost to Northampton Demons. In the 2011 season, Parkside Hawks won the Yorkshire (West) division and thus qualified for the Yorkshire Premier play-offs; this they won before making it to the finals of the RLC Premier division and winning the Harry Jepson Trophy by beating Accrington and Leyland Lions 24–16.

Club honours

 RLC North Midlands Division: 2009
 RLC Yorkshire Division: 2010
 RLC Yorkshire Premier: 2011
 Harry Jepson Trophy: 2011

External links
 Club website

Rugby League Conference teams
Sport in Leeds
Rugby clubs established in 2009
Rugby league teams in West Yorkshire